Bhamo ( ban: mau mrui., also spelt Banmaw; ; ; , Hsinkai) is a city in Kachin State in northern Myanmar,  south of the state capital, (Myitkyina). It is on the Ayeyarwady River. It lies within  of the border with Yunnan Province, China. The population consists of Chinese and Shan, with Kachin peoples in the hills around the town. It is the administrative center of Bhamo District and Bhamo Township.

Etymology
"Bhamo" derives from the Shan language term "Manmaw", which means "potter's village."

History 

From 1869 to 1879, it was the seat of British colonial Assistant political agent, subordinate to the Resident with the king of and in Ava. In the early 20th century, due to its location at the highest navigable point of the river, it formed a part of caravan routes bringing jade from India to China.

Bhamo was once called Sampanago, the capital of the now-extinct Shan predecessor kingdom of Wanmaw.

Contemporary 
A once weekly Myanma Airways flight is available, as are three times a week river ferries. It is the terminus of river ferries from Mandalay. There is no river ferry between Bhamo and state capital Myitkyina. The land route between Bhamo and Mu Se District (Muse, part of Northern Shan State), is in poor condition.

Bhamo is one of the official border trading towns between China and Myanmar.

Education 

The town is home to Bhamo University. One can also study engineering at Technological University (Bamaw), and computer and networking at Computer University (Bamaw).

Climate 
Bhamo has a climate that lies in the transition between tropical savanna climate (Köppen climate classification Aw) and humid subtropical climate (Köppen climate classification Cwa). Temperatures are very warm throughout the year, although the winter months (December–February) are milder. There is a winter dry season (November–April) and a summer wet season (May–October).

See also 

 Banmaw Airport

References

Sources 
 WorldStatesmen – Burma/Myanmar

Further reading 

 17th Century Burma and the Dutch East Indies Company 1634–1680, by Wil O. Dijk, NIAS Press

Township capitals of Myanmar
Populated places in Kachin State
Irrawaddy River